Habitation may refer to:
 Human settlement, a community in which people live
 Dwelling, a self-contained unit of accommodation used as a home
 Habitation (India), an administrative division in India
 Habitation at Port-Royal, France's first settlement in North America
 Habitation de Québec, buildings interconnected by Samuel de Champlain when he founded Québec
 Habitation La Grivelière, coffee plantation and coffeehouse in Vieux-Habitants, Basse-Terre, Guadeloupe

See also
 Habitation name, names denoting place of origin
 Habitation Module, Habitation Extension Module, for the International Space Station
 Habitat (disambiguation)